The Heritage is a 1978 Danish drama film directed by Anders Refn and starring Jens Okking.

Cast
 Jens Okking - Helmuth
 Helle Hertz - Alvilda
 Bodil Udsen - Juliane
 Stefan Ekman - Grev Scheele
 Poul Reichhardt - Adolf Mascani
 Birgit Sadolin - Johanne Mascani
 Stine Bierlich - Karen
 Anne Marie Helger - Frøken Jansen
 Masja Dessau - Clara Mascani
 Allan Olsen - Julius
 Otte Svendsen - Tjener Niels
 Folmer Rubæk - Forvalter Rasmus
 Ulla Lock - Stasia
 Inger Stender - Kammerjomfru
 Judy Gringer - Maren
 Elin Reimer - Stine
 Else-Marie - Amalie (as Else Marie Juul Hansen)
 Claus Strandberg - Jakob
 Bendt Rothe - Herredsfoged

External links

1978 films
1970s Danish-language films
1978 drama films
Danish drama films
Films directed by Anders Refn